Aabra Ka Daabra is a 2004 Indian Hindi-language fantasy film.

Plot
Shanu, a 12-year old boy lives with his mother Shivani Singh and father Rahul Singh. His father, Rahul Singh is a magician who is expert in doing Houdini Tricks. Once doing such a trick, he locks himself in a closed box and drops the box in sea but he failed to come out of the box and disappears mysteriously. The sudden disappearance of Rahul drives Shanu and his mother to live in worse conditions. People used to tease Shanu saying 'Son of loser'. However Shanu wins a competition by which he gets admission in any school he wishes. He takes admission in Abra Ka Dabra: School Of Magic where he meets Pinky and Limbu. He also meets the strict school principal of Abra Ka Dabra school, Rang Birangi  also called as RB. He studies many magic tricks in school and becomes an expert magician. While in school he comes to know that RB used to go somewhere at night in the forest. Shanu and his friends chase RB by eating an invisibility pill given by Limbu where he finds his father being imprisoned by RB. RB wants Rahul, Shanu's father to make Amarsanjivani (An Immortality Potion) for her which he made once when he was a teacher in Abra Ka Dabra School. RB sees Shanu and injects him with poison. Rahul, to save his son, continues to make the potion. Meanwhile he cures his son, Shanu and both stand against RB and a good magical fight happens, in which RB gets defeated promising to come back for revenge and dies. Shanu takes her magical wand and give it to Dilbaug Singh the guardian of Shanu. Everyone celebrates the strict-free environment in Abra Ka Dabra. Meanwhile the magical wand of RB disappears magically leaving the audience in suspense and at last Zulu, the demon-winged servant of RB questioned about comeback of RB and mystery of disappearance of magical wand pointing at the audience. And thus the movie ends.

Cast
Athit Naik as Shanu R. Singh
Hansika Motwani as Pinky
Satish Kaushik as Dilbaug Singh / Jadugar Pyaara Singh
Anupam Kher as Limbu
Krrishna as Rahul Singh
Johnny Lever as Maneklal
Archana Puran Singh as Suzanne
Nupur Mehta as Jadugarni Bijli / Headmistress Rang Birangi 'RB'
Shweta Tiwari as Shivani R. Singh
Naveen Bawa as Mind over matter instructor
Prabhu Deva as Dancer / Singer in the song "Shiv Om"

Soundtrack 

Music composed by Himesh Reshammiya.
The album has 8 tracks.

References

External links 
 

2004 films
2000s Hindi-language films
Films scored by Himesh Reshammiya
Indian fantasy films
Indian 3D films
2004 3D films
2004 fantasy films